Gino Pasqualotto (10 November 1955 – 20 June 2019) was an Italian ice hockey player. He competed in the men's tournament at the 1984 Winter Olympics.

References

External links
 

1955 births
2019 deaths
Bolzano HC players
HC Fiemme Cavalese players
Ice hockey players at the 1984 Winter Olympics
Italian ice hockey players
Olympic ice hockey players of Italy
Ice hockey people from Bolzano